Meow is a 2016 Indian Tamil-language thriller film directed by Chinnas Palanisamy and starring a persian cat named Jenny in the lead role along with Raja, Sanjay, Hayden, Kumar and Urmila Gayathri.

Plot

Cast

Production 
This was the first time a cat played the lead role in a Tamil film. The makers of the film bought a cat named Jenny for the film and used computer graphics for anything that the cat cannot do.

Reception 
Thinkal Menon of The Times of India gave the film a rating of two out of five stars and said that "The director has attempted to bring difference to a done-to-death plot by giving importance to a cat. Though the idea isn't bad, the poor quality of the computer graphics and ineffective screenplay let down the entire film". Chitra Deepa Anantharam of The Hindu mocked the film and said that "Those of you who withstood the last 30 minutes, may you come across an empty ATM loaded with cash or at least get change for Rs. 2000". On the contrary, Malini Mannath of The New Indian Express opined that "With 112 minutes of running time, Meow is a watchable and an engaging entertainer". A critic from Samayam said that the film could be enjoyed if you overlook the minor glitches. Critics from Dinamalar and Maalai Malar criticised the age-old storyline.

References

External links 
 

2010s Tamil-language films
2016 thriller films
Films about cats
Indian thriller films